European Parliament elections were held for the first time in Gibraltar on 10 June 2004 as part of European Union-wide elections. Although part of the European Union, Gibraltar had never before voted in European Parliamentary elections, in part due to its small electorate of just over 20,000 which would cause Gibraltar to be over-represented by about 30 times if even a single seat were to be assigned.

This disenfranchisement applied by the United Kingdom was successfully challenged before the European Court of Human Rights in 1999. As a result, from 2004 Gibraltar was included by the United Kingdom within the South West England region for electoral purposes.

Spain took a complaint about Gibraltar participating in EU elections to the Court of Justice of the European Union, objecting to the enfranchisement of Commonwealth citizens and the creation of a combined electoral region, but its case was unsuccessful.

None of the main Gibraltar political parties contested the election, so voters chose from United Kingdom party lists. However, Lyana Armstrong-Emery of the small Reform Party had a place on a joint list with the Green Party.

The Conservative Party polled over two-thirds of the Gibraltar vote, with no other party exceeding 10% support. This was in large part due to the perception that the Labour Government in Britain had "betrayed" Gibraltar by attempting to negotiate a constitutional settlement involving joint sovereignty with Spain.  This arrangement was rejected overwhelmingly by Gibraltarians in the 2002 sovereignty referendum. The Conservatives were perceived as being unequivocal in their support for Gibraltar's continued British status. In addition, both the leader of the Conservative Party, Michael Howard, and his deputy, Michael Ancram, flew in to rally support. Before the election, the local Conservatives mounted a vigorous campaign.

Results
Turnout was 57.5% in Gibraltar, higher than the 37.8% for the electoral region as a whole.

References

External links
Question over EU voting rights adds to dispute between Spain and Britain over Gibraltar status
Election 2004

Gibraltar
European Parliament elections in Gibraltar
Europe
June 2004 events in Europe